The Scottish Urban Archaeological Trust Ltd. (abbreviated SUAT) is an archaeological company. It was formed in 1982, replacing the Urban Archaeology Unit, itself established four years earlier. Based in Perth, Scotland, the Trust operates the monitoring and excavation of redevelopment in Scotland's medieval burghs.

Background
In the early days of the Trust's existence, large parts of its work was funded through a combination of Manpower Services Commission schemes and funding from SDD Ancient Monuments. After local authorities were reorganised in the 1990s, including the appointment of local-authority archaeologists, the funding for the monitoring project was brought to an end. SUAT shifted its work to concentrate on developed-funded archaeology, along with undertaking funded research projects from Historic Scotland's (now Historic Environment Scotland) archaeology programme.

Projects

In 1997, when proposals were made to dismantle and rebuild the eastern wall of Perth's Greyfriars Burial Ground, two test pits were dug by the Trust. One of the pits found what is believed to be the original monastery wall foundations. A "succession of wall foundations" hinted at several wall replacement and repair efforts undertaken during the monastery's lifespan, each raising the ground level. Medieval pottery was also discovered, likely associated with the soil of lower garden abutting the original monastery wall. The other pit demonstrated a lack of a progression of wall foundations, confirming that that area was inside the 1795 graveyard extension and outside the original monastery grounds. The second pit also showed signs of infilling or levelling layers, possibly from when a burn, which ran along the burial ground's southern wall, was covered with soil.

Publications
Perth: The Archaeology of the Medieval Town (1984)

References

External links
Scottish Urban Archaeological Trust Ltd – Archaeology Data Service

Companies of Scotland
1982 establishments in Scotland
Organizations established in 1982
Archaeological organizations
Organisations based in Perth, Scotland